Syed Mushtaq Ali (17 December 1914 – 18 June 2005) was an Indian cricketer, a right-handed opening batsman who holds the distinction of scoring the first overseas Test century by an Indian player when he scored 112 against England at Old Trafford in 1936.
 He batted right-handed but was a slow left arm orthodox spin bowler. He bowled frequently enough in domestic matches to be classified as an all-rounder but only occasionally in test matches. Mushtaq Ali was noted for his graceful batting style and a flair which often cost him his wicket by being over-adventurous too soon in an innings.

Career
Mushtaq Ali was the discovery of C. K. Nayudu who observed him at Indore at the age of 13 and helped to develop his cricketing skills.

A Wisden Special Award winner, he scored four first-class hundreds in the 1936 tour. He was an opening or middle order right-hand batsman but hardly played international cricket mainly due to World War II. In total, he played in 11 tests. He made his debut in the test against England at Calcutta, 5–8 Jan 1934, and played his last test against England at Madras, 6–10 Feb 1952, at the age of 38.

Domestic cricket
He was educated in Indore and at Aligarh Muslim University. He played extensively for regional teams and private clubs when cricket was a young sport in India.  In first-class cricket, he represented Holkar, Central India, Muslims, Maharashtra, Gujarat, Madhya Bharat, Uttar Pradesh, Madhya Pradesh and India between 1930 and 1964. He was not only a sporting legend, but a popular superstar of his time, and an icon for the younger generation of Indian youth. Combining with another legend, the cautious yet skilled Vijay Merchant, Mushtaq Ali's aggression and powerful stroke play formed a dynamic and legendary opening partnership for the team for years.

He played for Holkar in the National Championship for the Ranji Trophy along with other stalwarts like C. K. Nayudu. He was awarded the Padma Shri in 1964 and made a life member of the Marylebone Cricket Club for his contribution to the game. He published his autobiography, Cricket Delightful in 1967. He died in his sleep, at the age of 90 in 2005. The Indian domestic T20 series is named after him. Mushtaq Ali's son, Gulrez Ali, and his grandson, Abbas Ali, both played first-class cricket.

Awards
Padma Shri – awarded in 1964
Syed Mushtaq Ali Trophy – This is a Twenty20 cricket domestic championship in India, organized by the Board of Control for Cricket in India, among the teams from the Ranji Trophy. The 2008–09 season was the inaugural season for this trophy.

References 

 Smith, Martin (editor). The Promise of Endless Summer (Cricket Lives from the Daily Telegraph). Aurum (2013).

External links

 Obituary from Rediff.com
 "He played five-day cricket like one-day cricket": video feature from Cricinfo

1914 births
2005 deaths
Aligarh Muslim University alumni
Central India cricketers
Central Zone cricketers
Cricketers from Indore
East Zone cricketers
Gujarat cricketers
Holkar cricketers
India Test cricketers
Indian Muslims
Indian cricketers
Madhya Bharat cricketers
Madhya Pradesh cricketers
Maharashtra cricketers
Muslims cricketers
Rajasthan cricketers
Recipients of the Padma Shri in sports
Uttar Pradesh cricketers